Glenn "Chip" Curry is an American Democratic politician and youth advocate currently serving as the Maine State Senator for District 11. He has represented Waldo County in the State Senate since 2020 and is the student services coordinator at the University of Maine at Augusta (UMA)'s Rockland center. Curry earned an MS in College Student Personnel Services from Miami University in 1994 and worked in student services at Unity College and the University of Southern Maine (USM)'s Muskie School of Public Service before joining UMA.

Early life and education
Curry has worked in education and youth development since 1992, earning a Master of Science in College Student Personnel Services from Miami University in 1994. He moved to Waldo County the same year and worked as an academic advisor and student activities coordinator at Unity College and as an AmeriCorps VISTA project coordinator for the USM Edmund Muskie School of Public Service. Curry served on several task forces and statewide youth advocacy groups during this time, and in 2013 was hired as the student services coordinator at the University of Maine at Augusta center in Rockland.

Maine Senate
Curry first ran for Maine Senate in 2012 when he sought to unseat Republican incumbent Michael Thibodeau in then-district 23. He ran unopposed in the Democratic primary but lost 54%-46% in the general election.

In March 2020, Curry announced that he would run to fill Senate District 11 seat being vacated by Erin Herbig, who had been hired to be the Belfast city manager and therefore did not seek re-election. He defeated two opponents in two rounds of the ranked-choice Democratic primary and defeated Republican Duncan Milne 54%-46% in the general election.

As of 2021, he is a member of the Inland Fisheries and Wildlife committee and chair of Joint Committee on Innovation, Development, Economic Advancement and Business.

Personal life
Curry has been married to his wife Christi, a teacher, since 1995. The Currys have one daughter. Curry is a "proud member" of the Belfast Curling Club and the Northport Golf Club and serves as co-chair of the UMA Professional Employees Association. He has volunteered as a set builder for the Searsport District High School theater department since 1996.

Electoral record

References

External links
Chip Curry on Twitter
Senator Chip Curry on Facebook
Official Maine State Legislature page
Maine Senate Democrats page
2020 Maine Senate District 11 candidates' interview (video)

Year of birth missing (living people)
Living people
People from Belfast, Maine
21st-century American politicians
Democratic Party Maine state senators
Miami University alumni